Keshavarz Boulevard (Blvd.) ( Bolvār e Keshāvarz) or simply Bolvār (the Boulevard) is a central Boulevard in Tehran, Iran. It is a 2.2 km long, East-West boulevard which connects Valiasr Street and Valiasr Sq. to Imam Khomeini Hospital Complex and is located in District 6 of Tehran. This boulevard was named "Elizabeth Boulevard" after Queen Elizabeth II visit to Iran during the former regime of Iran, Pahlavi dynasty. However, after the 1979 Revolution, it was renamed Keshavarz (meaning "farmer" in Persian) Boulevard, as the main building of the Ministry of Agriculture of Iran was located close to this boulevard.

There are many buildings, organizations and offices all along the boulevard including various banks, hotels, hospitals as well as the Ministry of Agriculture building, and University of Tehran. Laleh Park which is one of the biggest parks in Tehran is also bordering the boulevard.

References

Streets in Tehran
Boulevards